John Kilborn (June 27, 1794 – after 1878) was a merchant, lumberman and political figure in Upper Canada. He represented Leeds in the Legislative Assembly of Upper Canada from 1828 to 1830 as a Reformer.

He was born in Elizabethtown Township, Upper Canada, the son of David Kilborn and Hannah White, and was educated near Brockville. In 1816, Kilborn married Elizabeth Baldwin. He lived in Brockville, later settling at Kilmarnock. Kilborn served in the militia during the War of 1812, later reaching the rank of lieutenant-colonel. He was named a justice of the peace for the Johnstown District in 1833. In 1852, he was named postmaster at Brockville and served as associate judge of assize at Brockville from 1853 to 1855.

References

Further reading 
Becoming Prominent: Leadership in Upper Canada, 1791-1841, J.K. Johnson (1989)

1794 births
Year of death missing
Members of the Legislative Assembly of Upper Canada
Province of Canada judges